Southill may refer to:

Southill, Bedfordshire, England
 Southill Park, a country house in Southill, Bedfordshire
Southill, Limerick, Ireland
Southill, Weymouth, Dorset, England

Southill may also refer to:
Viscount Torrington, Lord Byng of Southill